Century Precision Optics is an American lens manufacturing firm. It was founded in 1948 in North Hollywood, California. Century Optics makes a variety of digital, broadcast, projection, and industrial lenses. They have offices in Hauppauge, New York and Van Nuys, California.

Century Optics was acquired in 2000 by Schneider Optics, the U.S. subsidiary of the German firm Schneider Kreuznach. The Century name continues as a Schneider brand.

References

Lens manufacturers
Manufacturing companies of the United States
Technology companies established in 1948
1948 establishments in California
Technology companies disestablished in 2000
2000 disestablishments in California